Living Hope is the seventh commercial studio album by Phil Wickham, released on August 3, 2018, by Fair Trade Services. Unlike previous albums which were produced solely by Pete Kipley, Wickham chose to work with Ed Cash, Jonathan Smith, Nicolas Balachandran, Ran Jackson and Ricky Jackson in addition to Kipley.

Supported by the release of the album's title track, "Till I Found You" and "Great Things" as singles along with an album pre-order, Living Hope was released to critical acclaim and was commercially success, having charted in the Top 2 sectors of the American and British Christian music charts, and also peaked at No. 108 on the Billboard 200 in the United States.

Background
On March 30, 2018, Phil Wickham released "Living Hope" as the first single from the anticipated album, which was yet to be announced, with the single's release coinciding with Good Friday and Easter holidays. Wickham then issued "Till I Found You" as the second single on April 27, 2018, announcing the album title as Living Hope and indicated that it was slated for release in August 2018. On June 1, 2018, "Great Things" was released as the third single from Living Hope. 

Phil Wickham launched the album pre-order for Living Hope on June 29, 2018, availing the previously released singles with "Song in My Soul" featuring Hollyn released as an instant-grat download, whilst notifying that the album will be released on August 3, 2018, and that he will be celebrate by having a Living Hope Record Release Show at the Theatre at Ace Hotel in Los Angeles. The song, "How Great Is Your Love" was released on July 20, 2018, as the last instant-grat track before the full-length release.

Release and promotion
At the commencement of the digital pre-order period in June 2018, "Living Hope",  "Till I Found You", "Great Things" and "Song in My Soul" featuring Hollyn, were availed for instant download, being the first four promotional singles from the album. "How Great Is Your Love" was released on July 20, 2018, as the fifth and final promotional single from the album.

Phil Wickham celebrated the release of the album by having the Living Hope Record Release Show at the Theatre at Ace Hotel in Los Angeles with Mack Brock being his special guest.

Singles
Preceding the release of Living Hope, the album's title track, "Living Hope", was issued as a single on March 30, 2018. This was followed by "Till I Found You" which was also released as a single on April 27, 2018, and "Great Things" which was the third and final single to be released from the album on June 1, 2018.

Critical reception

Living Hope prompted generally positive reactions, with good sentiments echoed in reviews about the collection from critics within the CCM and contemporary worship music genres.

Reviewing for 365 Days of Inspiring Media, Jonathan Andre rated the album four and a half stars out of five, describing the worship as "unique, fresh, emotive, powerful and heartfelt," and went onto congratulate Wickham for "such a project that stands tall amongst many worship album releases of 2018 thus far." In a perfect five star review of the album at ChurchMag, Phil Schneider declared that "Phil Wickham's Living Hope is another stellar record from one of Christian music's best male artists." Cross Rhythms music critic Tony Cummings gave the album a perfect ten squares in his review, concluding: "A magnificent album which has the potential to enrich the spiritual lives of huge numbers of churchgoers." Bestowing the album a four-out-of-five rating for Hallels, Timothy Yap concluded "Living Hope, on the whole, is packed with church songs made for us to sing with our brothers and sisters in worship. Despite some spots of sloppiness, this is a treasuretrove for worship leaders and worshippers to mine as we search for ways to express our worship in ways that are Biblically sound and musically accommodating." Awarding a four and a half star rating at Louder Than The Music, Jono Davies assures "This really is a solid and compact album." Kevin Davis, in his review for NewReleaseToday, was of the opinion that Wickham has improved with each release and that Living Hope was "my top worship album of the year." Kelly Meade, indicating in a three-point-seven score review for Today's Christian Entertainment, says that Wickham "captures the essence of worship with this collection of music to allow our hearts & spirits to meditate on the goodness and power of God."

In an otherwise negative review from Jesus Freak Hideout, Lucas Munachen rated the collection two stars, says "Living Hope continues to follow the trend of anthemic, EDM laced music that in turn continues to be a forgettable product of its time." Munachen described the songwriting and production sound as being "so disappointingly artificial that the record simply does not come across as anything more than an impersonal product for the masses."

Accolades

Commercial performance
In the United States, Living Hope debuted at No. 22 on Billboard's Christian Albums chart dated August 11, 2018. The album then shot to No. 1 on Christian Albums chart dated August 18, 2018, having earned sales of 7,000 equivalent album units in its first week. Living Hope is Phil Wickham's second album to reach the top spot on the Christian Album chart after Sing-A-Long 3 (2015). The album was also listed as the sixteenth best-selling digital release in the country that same week, with an appearance on the mainstream Billboard 200 chart at No. 108.

In the United Kingdom, Living Hope debuted at No. 2 on the OCC's Official Christian & Gospel Albums Chart dated August 11, 2018.

Track listing

Living Hope (The House Sessions)

On January 18, 2019, Phil Wickham released a live album with nine live recordings of songs from the album, titled Living Hope (The House Sessions), via Fair Trade Services in digital format.

Personnel
Adapted from AllMusic.

 Nicolas Balachandran — background vocals, bass, guitar, keyboards, producer, programming
 Casey Brown — drums
 Chad Carouthers — bass, programming
 Ed Cash — acoustic guitar, mixing, producer, programming
 Dave Cook — background vocals, editing
 John Denosky — editing
 Zac Esposito — bass
 Hollyn — featured artist
 Ran Jackson — background vocals, bass, guitar, keyboards, producer, programming
 Ricky Jackson — background vocals, bass, guitar, keyboards, producer, programming
 Taylor Johnson — electric guitar
 Joe LaPorta — mastering
 Jeremy Larson — cello, string arrangements, viola, violin
 Paul Mabury — drums
 Matthew Melton — bass
 Buckley Miller — engineer
 Sean Moffitt — mixing
 Casey Moore — guitar
 Josh Murty — electronics
 North Coast Worship — background vocals
 David Ramirez — editing
 Travis Ryan — programming
 Jonathan Smith — acoustic guitar, background vocals, bass, electric guitar, keyboards, organ, piano, producer, programming
 Matt Stanfield — bass
 Aaron Sterling — drums
 Mark Suhonen — programming
 Phil Wickham — vocals, acoustic guitar, electric guitar, primary artist
 Brian Willett — programming
 Joe Williams — programming

Charts

Weekly charts

Year-end charts

Release history

References

External links
  on PraiseCharts

2018 albums
Phil Wickham albums